Robert James Ritchie (born January 17, 1971), known professionally as Kid Rock (also known as Bobby Shazam), is an American singer, songwriter and rapper. His style alternates between rock, hip hop, country, and metal. A self-taught musician, he has said that he can play every instrument in his backing band and has overseen production on all but two of his albums.

Kid Rock started his music career as a rapper and DJ, releasing his debut album Grits Sandwiches for Breakfast (1990) on Jive Records. His subsequent independent releases The Polyfuze Method (1993) and Early Mornin' Stoned Pimp (1996) saw him developing a more distinctive style, which was fully realized on his breakthrough album Devil Without a Cause (1998), which sold 14 million copies. This album and its follow-up, Cocky (2001), were noted for blending elements of hip hop, country and rock. His most successful single from that period, "Cowboy" (1999), is considered a pioneering song in the country rap genre. His best-selling singles overall are "Picture" (2002) and "All Summer Long" (2008). Starting with his 2007 album Rock n Roll Jesus, his musical output has tended to be in the country and rock styles.

Early life
Kid Rock was born Robert James Ritchie in Romeo, Michigan, on January 17, 1971, the son of Susan and William Ritchie, who owned multiple car dealerships. He was raised in his father's  home on a  property, where he regularly helped his family pick apples and care for their horses. His younger sister, Jill Ritchie, is an actress. In the 1980s, he became interested in hip hop, began to breakdance, and taught himself how to rap and DJ while performing in talent shows in and around Detroit.

Career

Early career, signing with Jive Records and Grits Sandwiches for Breakfast (1988–1990)
Kid Rock began his professional music career as a member of a hip hop music group called The Beast Crew in the late 1980s. During this time, he met rapper D-Nice. That relationship would eventually lead to him becoming the opening act at local shows for Boogie Down Productions.

During this time, Kid Rock began a professional association with producer Mike E. Clark, who, after some initial skepticism with the idea of a white rapper, found himself impressed with Kid Rock's energetic and well-received performance where the artist, using his own turntables and equipment, actually prepared his own beats to demonstrate his skills for Clark.

In 1988, Clark produced a series of demos with Kid Rock, and that eventually led to offers from six major record labels, including Atlantic and CBS Records.

In 1989, Kid Rock became a shareholder in an independent record label that was formed by Alvin Williams and Earl Blunt of EB-Bran Productions, called "Top Dog" Records. Later, that investment would become a 25% ownership stake.

With the help of D-Nice, Kid Rock signed with Jive Records at the age of 17, releasing his debut studio album, Grits Sandwiches for Breakfast in 1990. According to Kid Rock, the contract with Jive resulted in animosity from fellow rapper Vanilla Ice, who felt that he should have been signed with Jive instead of Kid Rock.

The album made Kid Rock one of the two biggest rap stars in Detroit in 1990, along with local independent rapper Esham. To promote the album, Kid Rock toured nationally with Ice Cube, D-Nice, Yo-Yo and Too Short; Detroit artist Champtown served as Kid Rock's DJ on this tour. During instore promotions for the album, Kid Rock met and developed a friendship with local rapper Eminem, who frequently challenged Kid Rock to rap battles.

Ultimately, unfavorable comparisons to Vanilla Ice led to Jive dropping Kid Rock, according to Mike E. Clark.

Signing with Continuum Records and The Polyfuze Method (1992–1995)
In 1992, Kid Rock signed with local independent record label Continuum. Around this time, Kid Rock met local hip hop duo Insane Clown Posse through Mike E. Clark, who was producing the duo. While ICP member Violent J disliked Kid Rock's music, he wanted the rapper to appear on ICP's debut album, Carnival of Carnage, believing the appearance would gain ICP notice, since Kid Rock was a nationally successful artist. Noting that local rapper Esham was paid $500 to appear on ICP's album, Violent J claims that Kid Rock demanded $600 to record his guest appearance, alleging that Esham and Kid Rock had a feud over who was the bigger rapper. Kid Rock showed up to record the song "Is That You?" intoxicated, but re-recorded his vocals and record scratching the following day.

In 1993, Kid Rock recorded his second studio album, The Polyfuze Method, with producer Mike E. Clark, who worked with Kid Rock to help give the album more of a rock-oriented sound than his debut.

Kid Rock also began releasing his "Bootleg" cassette series to keep local interest in his music.

Later in the year, Kid Rock recorded the EP Fire It Up at White Room Studios in downtown Detroit, run by brothers Michael and Andrew Nehra, who were forming the rock-soul band Robert Bradley's Blackwater Surprise. The EP featured the heavy rock song "I Am the Bullgod" and a cover of Hank Williams Jr.'s country song "A Country Boy Can Survive".

By 1994, Kid Rock's live performances had mostly been backed by DJs Blackman and Uncle Kracker, but Kid Rock soon began to utilize more and more live instrumentation into his performances, and formed the rock band Twisted Brown Trucker.

After breaking up with his girlfriend, Kid Rock moved engineer Bob Ebeling into his apartment. During a recording session with Mike E. Clark, the producer discovered that Kid Rock could sing when he recorded a reworked cover of Billy Joel's "It's Still Rock and Roll to Me", entitled "It's Still East Detroit to Me", which Clark claims led him to encourage Kid Rock to sing more.

During this time, Kid Rock developed animosity towards other Detroit artists, including Insane Clown Posse.

Through extensive promoting, including distributing tapes on consignment to local stores and giving away free samplers of his music, Kid Rock developed a following among an audience which DJ Uncle Kracker described as "white kids who dropped acid and liked listening to gangsta rap"; this following included local rapper Joe C, who had been attending Kid Rock concerts as a fan, but upon meeting Kid Rock, was invited to perform on stage as Kid Rock's hype man.

Early Mornin' Stoned Pimp and local breakthrough (1996)

Kid Rock's stage presence became honed with the addition of a light show, pyrotechnics, dancers and a light-up backdrop bearing the name "Kid Rock", and 1996 saw the release of his most rock-oriented album to date, Early Mornin' Stoned Pimp; the album's title came from Bob Eberling, who told a sleepless, alcoholic, drug-using Kid Rock, "Dude, you are the early-morning, stoned pimp." According to Kid Rock, who distributed the album himself, Early Mornin' Stoned Pimp sold 14,000 copies.

Kid Rock developed his stage persona, performing dressed in 1970s pimp clothing with a real, possibly loaded, gun down the front of his pants.

Though Kid Rock became known for frequent partying, and using drugs and alcohol, he was primarily focused on increasing his success and fame, placing himself as a businessman first; the result of this drive led to increased success locally.

Signing with Atlantic Records, Devil Without a Cause and national success (1997–2000)
Kid Rock's attorney, Tommy Valentino, increased his stature by helping him get articles written about Kid Rock and Twisted Brown Trucker in major publications, including the Beastie Boys' Grand Royal magazine, but though his management tried to interest local record labels in his music, they told his management team that they were not interested in signing a white rapper, to which Valentino told them, "He's not a white rapper. He's a rock star and everything in between."

In 1997, Jason Flom, head of Lava Records, attended one of Kid Rock's performances, and met with Kid Rock, who later gave him a demo containing the songs "Somebody's Gotta Feel This" and "I Got One for Ya", which led to Kid Rock signing with Atlantic Records. As part of his recording deal, Kid Rock received $150,000 from the label.

By this time Kid Rock had fully developed his stage persona, and musical style and wanted to make a "redneck, shit-kicking rock 'n' roll rap" album, resulting in his fourth studio album, Devil Without a Cause, recorded at the White Room in Detroit and mixed at the Mix Room in Los Angeles.

This was the album that put Kid Rock on the map nationally. He made an appearance on the 1999 MTV VMA (including a performance alongside Aerosmith and Run-DMC) and also memorably performed Bawitdaba at Woodstock 1999. Devil Without a Cause sold over 14 million copies, the album's success initiated by Kid Rock's breakthrough hit single Bawitdaba.

Despite having been active in the music industry for over 10 years by then, Kid Rock was nominated for a Grammy Award for Best New Artist of 2000. Kid Rock's career was sometimes marked by tragedy, as in the death of friend and collaborator Joe C.

In May 2000, Kid Rock released the compilation album The History of Rock behind the single "American Bad Ass". The song sampled Metallica's 1991 song "Sad but True", peaking at No. 20 on the mainstream rock chart. Kid Rock would join Metallica on their 2000 Summer Sanitarium Tour along with Korn and System of a Down. Kid Rock and Jonathan Davis filled in on vocals for an injured James Hetfield in Atlanta on July 7, 2000. Kid Rock performed "American Bad Ass" along with the Metallica classics "Sad but True", "Nothing Else Matters", "Fuel" and "Enter Sandman" in addition to covers of "Turn the Page" and "Fortunate Son". The History of Rock was certified double platinum. "American Bad Ass" was nominated for the Grammy for Best Hard Rock Performance in 2001, losing out to Rage Against the Machine's "Guerrilla Radio". His song with Robert Bradley "Higher" was featured in a TV spot for Gatorade.

Continued success and shift away from hip hop (1999–2008)

In 1999, Kid Rock made his voice acting debut in an episode of The Simpsons in the episode "Kill the Alligator and Run" playing himself, alongside Joe C. Kid Rock also appeared in comedy film Joe Dirt, starring David Spade. Kid Rock was in the live-action/animated film Osmosis Jones, voicing a bacterial cell version of himself named "Kidney Rock"; Kid Rock and Joe C had also recorded the song "Cool Daddy Cool" for the film's soundtrack album before Joe C's death. In November, Kid Rock released his fifth studio album, Cocky, which was dedicated to Joe C. The album became a hit, spurred by the crossover success of the single "Picture", a country ballad featuring Sheryl Crow which introduced Kid Rock to a wider audience and was ultimately the most successful single on the album.

In support of the album, Kid Rock performed on the Cocky Tour in 2002 and opened for Aerosmith with Run DMC on The Girls Of Summer Tour. During this period, Uncle Kracker began his solo career full-time. He was replaced by underground Detroit rapper Paradime.

In 2001, Kid Rock filed a lawsuit to gain full control over the Top Dog record label, resulting in his receiving full ownership of the label in 2003.

In 2002, Kid Rock covered ZZ Top's "Legs" to serve as WWE Diva Stacy Keibler's theme song; it also appeared on the album WWF Forceable Entry. The same year, Kid Rock performed alongside Chuck D and Grandmaster Flash in tribute to slain DJ Jam Master Jay.

2003 saw the release of Kid Rock's self-titled sixth album, which shifted his music further away from hip hop; the lead single was a cover of Bad Company's "Feel Like Makin' Love". The same year, Kid Rock contributed to the tribute album I've Always Been Crazy: A Tribute to Waylon Jennings, honoring the late country singer by covering the song "Luckenbach, Texas" in collaboration with country singer Kenny Chesney.

In 2004, he performed at the Super Bowl XXXVIII halftime show, in a controversial appearance that spurred criticism from Veterans of Foreign Wars and Senator Zell Miller for wearing the American flag with one slit in the middle, as a poncho; Kid Rock was accused of "desecrating" the flag. Kid Rock also appeared on the track 'My Name is Robert Too' on American blues artist R. L. Burnside's final studio album, A Bothered Mind.

In September 2005, Kid Rock filled in for Johnny Van Zant, the lead singer of Lynyrd Skynyrd, on the band's hit "Sweet Home Alabama" at the Hurricane Katrina benefit concert.

In 2006, Kid Rock stopped displaying the Confederate flag at his concerts. The following year, Kid Rock released his seventh studio album, Rock N Roll Jesus, which was his first release to chart at #1 on the Billboard 200, selling 172,000 copies in its first week and going on to sell over 5 million copies. In July 2007, Kid Rock was featured in the cover of Rolling Stone magazine for the second time. The album's third single, "All Summer Long", became a global hit, utilizing a mash up of Lynyrd Skynyrd's "Sweet Home Alabama" and Warren Zevon's "Werewolves of London".

In 2008, Kid Rock recorded and made a music video for the song "Warrior" for a National Guard advertising campaign.

Continued recording and controversies (2010–present)

In 2010, Kid Rock released his country-oriented eighth studio album, Born Free, produced by Rick Rubin, and featuring guest appearances by Sheryl Crow and Bob Seger.

In 2011, Kid Rock was honored by the NAACP, which sparked protests stemming from his past display of the Confederate flag in his concerts. During the ceremony, Kid Rock elaborated on his display of the flag, stating, "[I] never flew the flag with hate in my heart [...] I love America, I love Detroit, and I love black people." Kid Rock's publicist announced that 2011 was the year he officially distanced himself from the flag.

The following year, Kid Rock performed alongside Travie McCoy and The Roots in honor of the Beastie Boys, during the band's induction to the Rock & Roll Hall of Fame. 2012 also saw the release of Kid Rock's ninth studio album, Rebel Soul; he said that he wanted the album to feel like a greatest hits album, but with new songs. One of the songs on the album, "Cucci Galore", introduced Kid Rock's alter ego, Bobby Shazam.

In 2013, Kid Rock performed on the "Best Night Ever" tour, where he motioned to charge no more than $20 for his tickets. The following year, he moved to Warner Bros. Records, releasing his only album on the label, First Kiss, which he self-produced. The album debuted at number two on the Billboard 200 and sold more than 354,000 copies in the United States. Subsequently, after leaving Warner Bros., Kid Rock signed with the country label Broken Bow Records.

In 2015, following the Charleston church shooting, the Michigan chapter of the National Action Network protested outside of the Detroit Historical Museum which honored Kid Rock; activists urged Kid Rock to renounce the Confederate flag. Kid Rock wrote an email to Fox News Channel host Megyn Kelly, stating, "Please tell the people who are protesting to kiss my ass". The same day, the National Action Network protested Chevrolet for sponsoring Kid Rock's tour.

On July 12, 2017, Kid Rock shared a photo of a "Kid Rock for US Senate" yard sign on Twitter. However, he denied that he was running, citing his upcoming album release and tour. He later clarified that the campaign was a hoax. He donated $122,000, raised by selling "Kid Rock for U.S. Senate" merchandise, to a voter registration group.

Also in July, he released two singles from his next album, "Po-Dunk" and "Greatest Show on Earth", both released on the same day. In November of that year, he released his eleventh studio album, Sweet Southern Sugar. The same year also saw Kid Rock publicly advocate measures against ticket scalpers at his shows by making tickets more affordable for fans. Instead of getting paid for the show, he gets a percentage of concession and ticket sales.

In November 2017, Kid Rock fired his publicist, Kirt Webster, after Webster was accused of sexual misconduct.

In January 2018, the National Hockey League announced Kid Rock as the headlining entertainer for their January 28 All-Star Game, sparking negative online responses from hockey fans. Hockey player Jeremy Roenick praised the choice and condemned Kid Rock's critics, saying, "Kid Rock is the most talented musician, I think ever, on the planet, because you can put any instrument in your hand or on your mouth and you can play anything and rock a house and sing any kind of genre."

It was also announced that, in March 2018, Kid Rock would perform on Lynyrd Skynyrd's final tour before the Southern rock band retired, alongside Hank Williams Jr., Bad Company, the Marshall Tucker Band and 38 Special.

Kid Rock released his first greatest hits album titled Greatest Hits: You Never Saw Coming on September 21, 2018.

On March 29, 2020, Kid Rock released his first single under the name "DJ Bobby Shazam", entitled "Quarantine", which featured an old-school hip hop sound. The artist stated all proceeds from the single's sales will go to fight COVID-19.

During Kid Rock's 50th birthday livestream, he announced that he would be releasing a triple album consisting of a hip hop disc, a country music disc and a rock disc which would contain 30 new songs and 20 previously unreleased songs; the first single from the album, "Don't Tell Me How To Live", featuring the band Monster Truck, was released on November 18, 2021, and featured a rap rock sound reminiscent of his Devil Without a Cause album. On December 17, 2021, he released a cover of "Ala-Freaking-Bama" by Trace Adkins titled "Ala-Fuckin-Bama".

On January 25, 2022, Kid Rock released a single, "We The People" where he blasts the media, Dr. Anthony Fauci, masks, COVID-19 restrictions, and Big Tech all to the chorus of Let's Go Brandon.  That same day, he also released "Rockin'" and "The Last Dance". On January 28, 2022, he announced on his upcoming Bad Reputation Tour that he would not perform at venues that require masks and proof of vaccination and would cancel shows at such places.

On March 10, 2022, Kid Rock announced his upcoming twelfth studio album Bad Reputation, which would include his five previously released singles. It digitally released on March 21, while a physical release of the album occurred on April 6.

In January 2023, Kid Rock collaborated with Fueled by 808, Austin Mahone and Jimmie Allen on the single "No Limits".

Musical style, artistry and lyrics 

Kid Rock's music is noted for its eclectic sound. According to The Village Voice writer Chaz Kangas, "[Kid Rock's] own love and incorporation of his musical references isn't rooted in a nostalgia or a 'tribute,' but rather in his actively engaging the elements he finds compelling into a wholly new hodgepodge of his own invention." Because of this unique musical approach, Kid Rock has been described as a postmodern artist. His musical style encompasses hip hop,  country, outlaw country, country rock, rock, rock and roll, Southern rock, swamp rock, heartland rock, hard rock, rap rock, heavy metal, rap metal, nu metal, blues, funk, soul and blue-eyed soul. Kid Rock's music has been described by Pitchfork as a cross between Run-DMC, Lynyrd Skynyrd and AC/DC.

Kid Rock's lyricism ranges from the braggadocio to the introspective; many of his raps consist of broad, humorous boasting, while other songs in his catalog have dealt with more serious topics, including poverty, war, race relations, interracial dating, abortion and patriotism. Kid Rock also developed a "redneck pimp" alter ego to complement his humorous lyrics. According to Kid Rock, "I use straightforward words, you know. I'm not politically correct."

Kid Rock's influences include Bob Seger and the Beastie Boys. Cowboys & Indians claims that Kid Rock's song "Cowboy" had a major impact on the country music scene; the magazine wrote that artists Jason Aldean and Big & Rich, among others, were influenced by the song's country rap style. Kid Rock also had an impact on hip hop, serving as an influence on rappers like Yelawolf.

Personal life

Relationships

In eighth grade, Ritchie began an on-and-off relationship with classmate Kelley South Russell that lasted for the next decade. In summer 1993, Russell gave birth to his son, Robert James Ritchie Jr. They raised a total of three children together, two of whom Ritchie believed to be his. They split up in late 1993 when Ritchie discovered that only one of the two was his. He subsequently raised his son as a single father.

In 2000, Rolling Stone reported that Ritchie was dating model Jaime King. He began dating actress Pamela Anderson in 2001 and they became engaged in April 2002, but ended their relationship in 2003. They later reconciled and were married in July 2006. Three months later, on November 10, it was announced that Anderson, who had been pregnant with Ritchie's child, had miscarried. On November 27, she filed for divorce from Ritchie in Los Angeles County Superior Court, citing irreconcilable differences. Ritchie later claimed that the divorce was due to Anderson openly criticizing his mother and sister in front of his son.

In 2014, Ritchie became a grandfather when his son's girlfriend gave birth to a daughter. In November 2017, he became engaged to longtime girlfriend Audrey Berry.

Ritchie is an ordained minister and has a firearm collection.

Public image 

In 1989, Ritchie became a shareholder of the independent record label Top Dog Records, formed by Alvin Williams and Earl Blunt of EB-Bran Productions, in 1988; Ritchie's investment in the company gave him 25% ownership. In 2001, he filed a lawsuit to gain full control over the Top Dog record label, resulting in his receiving full ownership of the label in 2003. Ritchie also founded Kid Rock's Made in Detroit restaurant and bar, which specializes in Southern-style cuisine.

In 2002, Ritchie performed alongside Chuck D and Grandmaster Flash in tribute to slain DJ Jam Master Jay. His performance at the Super Bowl XXXVIII, in 2004, drew criticism from Veterans of Foreign Wars and Senator Zell Miller for wearing the American flag with one slit in the middle, as a poncho; Ritchie was accused of "desecrating" the flag.

In January 2005, Ritchie performed at the inaugural address of reelected president George W. Bush, sparking criticism from conservative groups, due to Ritchie's lyrics. In September, Kid Rock filled in for Johnny Van Zant, the lead singer of Lynyrd Skynyrd, on the band's hit "Sweet Home Alabama" at the Hurricane Katrina benefit concert. In 2007 and 2008, Ritchie toured for the United Service Organizations. Also in 2008, Ritchie recorded and made a music video for the song "Warrior" for a National Guard advertising campaign.

A philanthropist, Ritchie oversees The Kid Rock Foundation, a charity which raises funds for multiple causes, including campaigns which sent "Kid Rock care packages" to U.S. military personnel stationed overseas. Ritchie is an advocate for affordable concert tickets, and makes an effort to try and sell tickets to his performances for as low as possible to encourage increased concert attendance for lower income consumers and discourage scalping. Instead of getting paid for the show, he gets a percentage of concession and ticket sales.

In 2011, Ritchie was honored by the NAACP, which sparked protests stemming from his past display of the Confederate flag in his concerts. During the ceremony, Kid Rock elaborated on his display of the flag, stating, "[I] never flew the flag with hate in my heart [...] I love America, I love Detroit, and I love black people." Ritchie's publicist announced that 2011 was the year he officially distanced himself from the flag. In 2012, Kid Rock performed alongside Travie McCoy and The Roots in honor of the Beastie Boys, during the band's induction to the Rock & Roll Hall of Fame. In 2013, Ritchie criticized Republican lawmakers in New York for passing laws which made it difficult for him to keep concert ticket prices low.

In January 2015, Ritchie was criticized by fans for appearing in a photograph holding up a dead cougar that was killed on a hunting trip with Ted Nugent. In 2015, following the Charleston church shooting, the Michigan chapter of the National Action Network protested outside of the Detroit Historical Museum which honored Ritchie; activists urged Ritchie to renounce the Confederate flag, which he had displayed in concerts from 2001 to 2006. Ritchie wrote an email to Fox News Channel host Megyn Kelly, stating, "Please tell the people who are protesting to kiss my ass". The same day, the National Action Network protested Chevrolet for sponsoring Ritchie's tour. In September 2016, Ritchie was criticized for allegedly saying "man, fuck Colin Kaepernick" during a live performance of his song "Born Free".

In November 2017, Ritchie fired his publicist, Kirt Webster, after Webster was accused of sexual misconduct. On April 6, 2018, Ritchie was inducted into the Celebrity Wing of the WWE Hall of Fame during the weekend of Wrestlemania 34.

On November 30, 2019, Ritchie drew controversy after he was recorded making a series of inappropriate statements while intoxicated at his restaurant in Nashville, including rude comments about Oprah Winfrey and Joy Behar. After receiving major pushback for his comments, Ritchie decided to close the Detroit branch of his restaurant in December 2019, located at the Little Caesar's Arena. When asked for comment about the closure, he stated that "it's wise to go where you're celebrated, not tolerated". In a June 2022 interview with Tucker Carlson on Tucker Carlson Originals: Life of a Rockstar, Richie refused to apologize for the incident.

In June 2021, Kid Rock attracted further controversy for using the word "faggot" onstage during a tirade against fans who were filming his performance. He later defended his remarks while reaffirming his love for his homosexual friends. In July 2022 he faced additional accusations of homophobia after, on June 30, 2022, he posted a meme on Truth Social and on Twitter stating, "If you're anti-gun, you don't get to celebrate the 4th of July, You would have never fought back. Enjoy your pride month. Pussy."

Politics and views
Ritchie is a supporter of the Republican Party, although he has routinely proclaimed himself as libertarian philosophically, stating he has socially liberal views on topics like abortion and gay marriage but conservative views on economics. Ritchie has advocated legalizing and taxing marijuana, cocaine, and heroin. He has also stated, "I don't think crazy people should have guns." He was a vocal supporter of American military involvement in the Iraq War. Ritchie has met with presidents Bill Clinton, Barack Obama, and Donald Trump while they were in office. Regarding his political views, Ritchie said, "I have friends everywhere. Democrat, Republican, this that and the other. ... We're all human beings first, Americans second. Let's find some common ground and get along." However, during his speech at the 2018 WWE Hall of Fame ceremony, he stated that he wanted to "body slam some Democrats".

Ritchie supported Bill Clinton and George W. Bush during their presidencies. In 2008, Ritchie supported newly elected President Barack Obama, saying that the president's election was "a great thing for black people." In 2012, Ritchie campaigned for Republican presidential candidate Mitt Romney; the candidate used Ritchie's song "Born Free" as his campaign theme. In 2015, Ritchie publicly endorsed Ben Carson for the Republican nomination for President of the United States in the 2016 election. In February 2016, he voiced approval for Donald Trump's campaign for the same office. In December, Kid Rock sparked controversy for selling T-shirts supporting Trump at concerts, including one showing a map of the United States which labelled the states which had voted against Trump as "Dumbfuckistan".

On July 12, 2017, Ritchie shared a photo of a "Kid Rock for US Senate" yard sign on Twitter. He also launched a website at kidrockforsenate.com, which sold merchandise bearing that inscription. Several weeks later, he wrote a post on his blog stating that he was still "exploring my candidacy", and that, whether or not he ran, he wanted to register people to vote, because "although people are unhappy with the government, too few are even registered to vote or do anything about it." He added that he wanted "to help working class people in Michigan and America all while still calling out these jackass lawyers who call themselves politicians." His statements sparked media speculation that he would try to run on the Republican ticket against sitting Michigan senator Debbie Stabenow, as well as enthusiasm from some prominent Republicans, including former New York Governor George Pataki, who wrote on Twitter, "Kid Rock is exactly the kind of candidate the GOP needs right now." In an October 2017 interview with Howard Stern, Ritchie put an end to the speculation, saying that he had never intended to run for Senate, adding rhetorically, "Who couldn't figure that out?". He later clarified that the campaign was a joke that he had started after a Michigan state legislator encouraged him to run for Senate. He expressed surprise at the interest his potential candidacy had received, but also disappointment that some opposed to his candidacy had brought up his previous use of the Confederate flag to label him a racist. He donated the $122,000 he had raised by selling "Kid Rock for U.S. Senate" merchandise to CRNC Action, a College Republican group.

Legal issues
In both March 1991 and September 1997, Ritchie faced misdemeanor charges stemming from alcohol-related arrests in Michigan.

In 2005, Ritchie was charged with assaulting a DJ in a strip club.

In 2006, California pornographic film company Red Light District attempted to distribute a 1999 sex tape in which Kid Rock and Scott Stapp, lead singer of the band Creed, are seen partying and receiving oral sex from groupies; both Rock and Stapp filed with the California courts to sue the pornographers to stop the tape's distribution.

At the 2007 MTV Video Music Awards, Ritchie got into a fistfight with Mötley Crüe drummer Tommy Lee, another ex of Anderson's, and was charged with assault. A month later, he was arrested and charged with battery after fighting with a Waffle House customer. He pleaded no contest to one count and was fined $1,000, as well as being required to perform 80 hours of community service and complete a six-hour anger management course.

On December 22, 2017, Kid Rock was sued by Ringling Bros. and Barnum & Bailey Circus (which closed seven months earlier) for using their slogan "Greatest Show on Earth" as the name of his 2018 tour. In January 2018, Kid Rock changed the tour's name to American Rock N' Roll Tour as a result of the lawsuit.

Discography

 Grits Sandwiches for Breakfast (1990)
 The Polyfuze Method (1993)
 Early Mornin' Stoned Pimp (1996)
 Devil Without a Cause (1998)
 Cocky (2001)
 Kid Rock (2003)
 Rock n Roll Jesus (2007)
 Born Free (2010)
 Rebel Soul (2012)
 First Kiss (2015)
 Sweet Southern Sugar (2017)
 Bad Reputation (2022)

Awards and nominations

Filmography

Film

Television

Tours 
 Straight From the Underground Tour (1990) (opened for Ice Cube, Too $hort, D Nice and Yo-Yo)
 Pimp Of The Nation Tour (1996–1997)
 Warped Tour (1998)
 Devil Without a Cause (1998–1999)
 M2K (2000)
 Summer Sanitarium Tour (2000)
 History of Rock Tour (2000)
 The American Badass Tour (2001)
 Cocky Tour (2002)
 Girls of Summer (2002)
 Rock N' Roll Pain Train Tour (2004)
 Live Trucker (2006)
 Ballroom Blitz Tour (2007)
 Rock N' Roll Revival Tour (2008)
 Rock N' Rebels Tour (2008-2009)
 The Circle Tour (2010)
 Born Free Tour (2011)
 Care Tour (2011)
 Rebel Soul Tour (2013)
 $20 Best Night Ever Tour (2013)
 Because We Can Tour (2013)
 Rock N' Rollin Tour (2014)
 First Kiss (2015)
 Kid Rock 2016 Tour (2016)
 American Rock N' Roll Tour (2018)
 Red Blooded Rock 'n' Roll Redneck Extravaganza (2018)
 Hot September Nights (2019)
 Bad Reputation Tour (2022)

References

External links

 
 
 Appearances on C-SPAN

1971 births
Living people
20th-century American drummers
20th-century American guitarists
20th-century American male musicians
20th-century American rappers
21st-century American drummers
21st-century American guitarists
21st-century American male singers
21st-century American rappers
21st-century American singers
American country rock singers
American country singer-songwriters
American hip hop DJs
American hip hop singers
American hunters
American libertarians
American male drummers
American male guitarists
American male pianists
American male rappers
American male singer-songwriters
American multi-instrumentalists
American rock guitarists
American rock singers
American rock songwriters
American Southern Rock musicians
Atlantic Records artists
Country musicians from Michigan
Guitarists from Detroit
Michigan Republicans
Midwest hip hop musicians
Nu metal singers
People from Clarkston, Michigan
People from Romeo, Michigan
Postmodern musicians
Rap metal musicians
Rap rock musicians
Rappers from Detroit
Rock and roll musicians
Rock DJs
Singers from Detroit
Swamp rock musicians
World Music Awards winners
WWE Hall of Fame inductees
Singer-songwriters from Michigan
Lava Records artists